Keith Henry Plunkett (died 10 June 1994) was an Australian politician who represented the South Australian House of Assembly seat of Peake from 1979 to 1989.

References

 

Members of the South Australian House of Assembly
1994 deaths
Australian Labor Party members of the Parliament of South Australia